White Star, is an unincorporated community north of Saskatchewan's third largest city, Prince Albert, Saskatchewan, Canada.  White Star is located within the Buckland Rural Municipality.  The community is located on Saskatchewan Highway 780 and the Viterra inland terminal is served by Carlton Trail Railway.

The White Star post-office opened on July 1, 1914 and was in operation until December 31, 1964.

References 

Buckland No. 491, Saskatchewan
Unincorporated communities in Saskatchewan
Division No. 15, Saskatchewan